Planorbis corinna is a species of minute, air-breathing freshwater snail, an aquatic pulmonate gastropod mollusk, or micromollusk in the family Planorbidae, the ram's horn snails, or planorbids. All planorbids have sinistral or left-coiling shells.

Distribution
This species is endemic to New Zealand.

Shell description
This species, like all planorbids, has a sinistral shell. The shell in this species is very minute, discoidal, with four slowly increasing whorls. The shell coloration is greenish-white to light brown. The width of the shell is up to 3.3 mm, and the height is up to 0.8 mm.

References

Planorbidae
Gastropods described in 1850
Taxa named by John Edward Gray